Partial legislative elections were held in Belgium on 5 and 12 July 1896. Under the alternating system, elections were held in only five out of the nine provinces: Antwerp, Brabant, Luxembourg, Namur and West Flanders. Only 77 seats out of the 152 seats in the Chamber of Representatives were up for election. The Catholic Party retained their absolute majority.

The Liberal Party, who lost two-thirds of their seats in the previous elections, saw their number of seats decrease further.

Results

References

Belgium
1890s elections in Belgium
General
Belgium